Shustir.com is a website that connects small businesses with consumers who prefer to buy locally, and from independent retailers and professionals. It enables small businesses to set up virtual storefronts to sell their goods and services, improve visibility in search engines, and communicate with prospective customers and clients through community building and social networking.

History 
Co-founders Shulammite Kim and Khanh Pham launched Shustir.com on May 28, 2009. Prior to starting Shustir.com, Kim and Pham were former colleagues in the Lehman Brothers Global Real Estate Group and worked as senior investment professionals for over eight years prior to the firm's collapse in 2008.
 
Kim and Pham developed Shustir.com to meet the need of small businesses to have a web presence. Only a reported 44% of small businesses have website even though 92% of all online consumers tend to shop locally (source: WebVisible/Nielsen Online) 1. Despite the recession's onset, online sales increased in 2008.

Shustir.com is a Web 2.0 marketplace that combines e-commerce functionality with social media and social networking tools to form a platform for small businesses to not only sell their goods and services online to increase their revenues, but also to connect with more consumers beyond their geographic locales and grow their businesses.

The site is geared to help consumers find and buy from local and independent businesses, citing growing desires to keep money in local communities and obtain higher-quality products and services. Studies conducted by Civic Economics have found that spending with local businesses returns a majority of each dollar received back to their own communities.

The site is funded from the principals’ personal savings and a private angel investor.

Revenue 

The site earns revenue through sales of display advertising and monthly premium storefront subscriptions.

References

External links 
 Shustir.com
1http://www.webvisible.com/press.asp?ID=27

2https://www.census.gov/compendia/statab/tables/09s1016.pdf

2https://www.census.gov/compendia/statab/tables/09s1015.pdf

 http://www.andersonvillestudy.com
 http://www.civiceconomics.com/SF
 http://www.localfirst.com
 http://www.liveablecity.org/lcexecsum.pdf

Online marketplaces of the United States